The Forgotten Army – Azaadi Ke Liye is a streaming television series which premiered on Amazon Prime Video on 24 January 2020. The series is directed by Kabir Khan, and is based on true events about the men and women in the Indian National Army (INA) led by Subhash Chandra Bose. The series stars Sunny Kaushal and Sharvari. Kabir Khan made his directorial debut with a documentary titled The Forgotten Army in 1999 which was aired by Doordarshan; and during a promotional talk, Kabir Khan said the current series is a project that is 20 years in the making, based on his initial documentary. The shooting took place in locations such as Thailand, Singapore, Malaysia and Mumbai.

Synopsis
The Forgotten Army – Azaadi Ke Liye, is based on the true story of Indian soldiers who marched towards the capital, with the war cry 'Challo Dilli', to gain Indian independence from colonial rule. The Indian National Army (INA), which was born out of Indian soldiers who defected to the Empire of Japan during WWII, was led by Subhash Chandra Bose and had the first women's infantry regiment since the Russian units of 1917–1918. While these soldiers (consisting of both men and women) fought against all odds to gain India its independence, their struggle and story somehow got lost and they became 'the forgotten army'. With the love story between two soldiers – Sodhi and Maya at the heart of it, the series raises several questions about identity, independence and the idea of motherland and the cost of freedom. Freedom, that we often take for granted but freedom that costs countless lives and sacrifices. Fighting to keep freedom alive is often more difficult than fighting to gain freedom.

Cast
Sunny Kaushal as Lieutenant(when in the British Indian Army)/Captain(when in the Indian National Army) Surinder Sodhi
M. K. Raina as Old Surinder Sodhi
Sharvari Wagh as Maya Shrinivasan
 Rohit Choudhary as Arshad
TJ Bhanu as Rasamma
Karanvir Malhotra as Amar
R Badree as Rajan
Paloma Monnappa as Rani
Shruti Seth as Captain Lakshmi Swaminathan
Akhil Iyer as Shridhar
Toshiji Takeshima as Daichi
Amala Akkineni as Maya's Mother
Nizhalgal Ravi As Maya's Father
Kajol Muskan as Woman soldier(drill commander)
Junichi Kajioka as Lieutenant General Iwaichi Fujiwara
Bijou Thaangjam as Japanese Soldier

Critical reception 
The New Indian Express writes that the movie is filled with heartfelt nationalism but falls short on depth. Pratishruti Ganguly writes in the Firstpost that the short series has good performances by numerous actors as well as excellent camera-work, both contributing to a worthwhile cinematic experience.

References

External links
 

Amazon Prime Video original programming
2020 Indian television series debuts
Indian National Army in fiction
2020s Indian television miniseries
Television shows set in Singapore
Television series set in 1996
Television series set in the 1940s
Cultural depictions of Subhas Chandra Bose
Television shows set in Myanmar
Burma in World War II
List of World War II TV series